Bridge over the Elbe or The Legion of No Return (Italian:Quel maledetto ponte sull'Elba, Spanish: No importa morir) is a 1969 Italian-Spanish war film directed by León Klimovsky and starring Tab Hunter, Howard Ross and Erika Wallner.

Cast
 Tab Hunter as Richards 
 Howard Ross as Charlie Hines  
 Erika Wallner as Erika  
 Claudio Trionfi as Johnny Eisenhower 
 Rosanna Yanni as Christina  
 Óscar Pellicer as Stiles  
 Ángel del Pozo as Rod 
 Gaspar 'Indio' González as Doyle  
 Daniele Vargas as Major Larson
 Alfonso de la Vega SS Officer
 José Guardiola German Commander
 Antonio Delgado
 Barta Barri Sgt. Mueller

References

Bibliography 
 Victoria Ruétalo & Dolores Tierney. Latsploitation, Exploitation Cinemas, and Latin America. Routledge, 2009.

External links 
 

1969 films
1969 war films
Macaroni Combat films
1960s Italian-language films
1960s Spanish-language films
Films directed by León Klimovsky
Films set in Germany
Italian World War II films
Spanish World War II films
1960s multilingual films
Italian multilingual films
Spanish multilingual films
1960s Italian films
1960s Spanish films